Taban Sharifa Aate is a Ugandan politician and legislator. She represents the people of Koboko district as a  Woman MP In the 11th parliament of Uganda. She subscribes to the National Resistance Movement party (NRM) a party under the chairmanship of Yoweri Kaguta Museveni, president of the republic of Uganda.

Background and education 
Aate is a grand daughter of former Ugandan leader president Idi Amin Dada and daughter to Taban Amin who had launched a rebellion against government after his father Amin was ousted out of power but was later offered Amnesty by the Museveni government.

Despite the prior bad blood between the families of Amin, and Museveni, Aate was able to study on state house scholarship offered by president Museveni and views him as a father figure.

Aate is now a member of the National Resistance Movement on whose ticket she rode to get to Parliament. She won with 44,616 votes against Ariye Eunice Owinyi's 4,937 votes.

Her brother Taban Idi Amin was former MP Kibanda county Kiryandongo district on the NRM ticket.

Career 

In the parliament of Uganda, Aate serves on the committee on Education and sports.

References 

Women members of the Parliament of Uganda
Members of the Parliament of Uganda
21st-century Ugandan women politicians
21st-century Ugandan politicians
National Resistance Movement politicians
Year of birth missing (living people)
Living people